Oliver H. P. Garrett (May 6, 1894 – February 22, 1952) was an American film director, writer, newspaperman, and rifleman.

Biography
Oliver H. P. Garrett was born in Laurens County, South Carolina.

By the fall of 1917 he was a rifleman who fought against the Germans, but he was wounded and won the Distinguished Service Cross. He interviewed Al Capone and Adolf Hitler in 1923 after the failed Pusch and in the early 1930s. He was a newspaperman for The Sun in the 1920s, and he was the only on board of the SS Morro Castle until his burning and sinking. He was hired by David O. Selznick after writing the final script of Gone with the Wind (1939) because Scott Fitzgerald wanted a film of conventional length.

Garrett was a close friend and next-door neighbour to Hollywood producer Irving Thalberg. When Thalberg married movie star Norma Shearer, Oliver was the usher of the wedding.

Career
He directed and wrote the screenplay for Careful, Soft Shoulder (1942). The script employs a first-person narrative and his direction is not imaginative and uses a first-person camera.

He wrote the story and dialogue for Street of Chance (1942), based on the life of the gangster Arthur Rothstein and it is a remake of the 1930 film. According to Louella O. Parsons, "Oliver H. P. Garrett has written a thriling story, but even so, much of the credit must go to John Cromwell, who directed the story with finesse and with a fine regard for detail.

He wrote the story for the crime drama Her Husband Lies (1937), which was adapted and was also a remake of Street of Chance, starring William Powell and Kay Francis. He wrote the screenplay and the dialogue of For the Defense (1930), and Scandal Sheet (1931). The Texan (1930) was based on an adaption of the story The Double-Eyed Deceiver. City Streets (1931), directed by Rouben Mamoulian, was adapted by Max Marcin and Garrett wrote the script. He wrote the screenplay for The Man I Married (1940).

Filmography

References

Bibliography

External links
 

1894 births
1952 deaths
American film directors
American newspaper writers
American male screenwriters
American television writers
Screenwriters from South Carolina
20th-century American male writers
20th-century American journalists
American male journalists
United States Army personnel of World War II
American male non-fiction writers
American male television writers
20th-century American screenwriters